Chapayevo may refer to:
Chapayevo, Kazakhstan, a village in Almaty Province of Kazakhstan
Chapayevo, Russia, several rural localities in Russia
Chapayevo Microdistrict, a microdistrict in the city of Kaliningrad, Kaliningrad Oblast, Russia